Shaoul Smira is an American artist.

Early life
Shaoul Smira moved to Israel from Iraq as a child in 1951, found his métier in art and received his training in Tel Aviv, Israel at the Avni Art Institute.  In 1965 he moved to Paris and continued his studies in the Academy Chomier.  These endeavors progressed in 1971 when Smira attended the Antwerp Academy to study etching and in 1976 when he attended workshops in Belgium to study the process of cast paper work. Smira also attended workshops in 1985 at the Atelier Mourlot for series of lithos. Smira has been living and working in New York since 1978.

References

External links
 Official website

American artists
Israeli artists
Living people
Royal Academy of Fine Arts (Antwerp) alumni
Year of birth missing (living people)